Wilde is a 1997 British biographical film directed by Brian Gilbert and starring Stephen Fry in the title role. The screenplay by Julian Mitchell is based on the Pulitzer Prize-winning 1987 biography of Oscar Wilde by Richard Ellmann. Fry received critical acclaim for his performance as well as for his likeness to Wilde, and was nominated for a Golden Globe for Best Actor – Drama.

Jennifer Ehle (as Oscar's wife Constance Lloyd Wilde) and Zoë Wanamaker (as Ada Leverson) were both nominated for the BAFTA Award for Best Actress in a Supporting Role. Starring as Lord Alfred "Bosie" Douglas, Jude Law was nominated for the Evening Standard British Film Award for Most Promising Newcomer. The film also sees Orlando Bloom make his screen debut.

Plot
The film opens with Oscar Wilde's 1882 visit to Leadville, Colorado during his lecture tour of the United States. Despite his flamboyant personality and urbane wit, he proves to be a success with the local silver miners as he regales them with tales of Renaissance silversmith Benvenuto Cellini.

Wilde returns to London and weds Constance Lloyd. They have two sons in quick succession. While their second child is still an infant, the couple hosts a young Canadian named Robbie Ross, who seduces Wilde and helps him come to terms with his homosexuality. Ross' love for Wilde endures. On the opening night of his play Lady Windermere's Fan, Wilde is re-introduced to the dashingly handsome and foppish poet Lord Alfred Douglas, whom he had met briefly the year before. The two fall into a passionate and tempestuous relationship. The hedonistic Douglas is not content to remain monogamous and frequently engages in sexual activity with rent boys while his older lover plays the role of voyeur.

Douglas' father, the Marquess of Queensberry, a violent and cruel man, objects to his son's relationship with Wilde and demeans the playwright shortly after the opening of The Importance of Being Earnest. When Wilde sues the Marquess for criminal libel, his homosexuality is publicly exposed.  He is eventually tried for gross indecency and sentenced to two years' hard labour. Constance is advised by friends to go abroad and change her name to protect the children.

Prison life is grueling; the penal treadmill permanently wrecks Wilde's health. Bosie tells Robbie he will look after Wilde in some pleasant sunny place when he is released. Constance visits him in prison. She is sending Cyril to school in Germany, and she may need back surgery. He tells her he has always loved her, and that he did not know himself in the beginning. She tells him she does not want a divorce. The children love him and he is welcome to visit as long as he never sees Douglas again.

Loyal friend Ada Leverson meets Wilde when he is released from prison in May 1897, carrying the manuscript of De Profundis. He goes straight into exile, to continental Europe. He puts flowers on Constance's grave. Since she died (in April 1898) he is no longer allowed to see his children. He eventually meets with Douglas. A printed epilogue notes that they parted after three months and describes Wilde's death in Paris in November 1900 at age 46 and the fates of Bosie and Ross.

Portions of the beloved Wilde story The Selfish Giant are woven throughout the film, beginning when Wilde tells the story to his children, then as Constance reads the book to them and so on until Wilde almost finishes the story in a voice-over as the film nears its end.

Cast

 Stephen Fry as Oscar Wilde
 Jude Law as Lord Alfred "Bosie" Douglas
 Vanessa Redgrave as Jane Francesca Agnes "Speranza", Lady Wilde
 Jennifer Ehle as Constance Lloyd Wilde
 Gemma Jones as Sibyl Douglas, Marchioness of Queensberry
 Judy Parfitt as Lady Mount-Temple
 Michael Sheen as Robbie Ross
 Zoë Wanamaker as Ada Leverson
 Tom Wilkinson as John Douglas, 9th Marquess of Queensberry 
 Ioan Gruffudd as John Gray
 Benedict Sandiford as Alfred Wood
 Mark Letheren as Charles Parker
 Albert Welling as Arthur
 Orlando Bloom as Rentboy

Production notes
In a featurette on the film's DVD release, producer Marc Samuelson confesses casting Stephen Fry in the title role was both a blessing and a problem. Everyone agreed he was physically perfect for the part and more than capable of carrying it off, but the fact he was not a major presence in films made it difficult for them to obtain financing for the project.

In the DVD commentary, Fry, who is gay, admitted he was nervous about the love scenes with his heterosexual co-stars. He says Jude Law, Michael Sheen and Ioan Gruffudd were quick to put him at ease.

Scenes were filmed at Knebworth House in Hertfordshire; Lulworth Cove, Studland Bay, and Swanage Pier in Dorset; Houghton Lodge in Hampshire; Luton Hoo in Bedfordshire; Magdalen College in Oxford; Lincoln's Inn in Holborn and Somerset House in the Strand.

The film premiered at the 1997 Venice Film Festival and was the opening night selection at the 1998 San Francisco International Film Festival.

Orlando Bloom made his first on-screen appearance in this film with a brief role as a rent boy.

Release

Critical reaction
In her review in The New York Times, Janet Maslin called the film "a broad but effectively intimate portrait" and added, "Playing the large dandyish writer with obvious gusto, Stephen Fry looks uncannily like Wilde and presents an edgy mixture of superciliousness and vulnerability. Though the film suffers a case of quip-lash thanks to its tireless Wildean witticisms ... Fry's warmly sympathetic performance finds the gentleness beneath the wit."

Roger Ebert of the Chicago Sun-Times said the film "has the good fortune to star Stephen Fry, a British author, actor and comedian who looks a lot like Wilde and has many of the same attributes: He is very tall, he is somewhat plump, he is gay, he is funny and he makes his conversation into an art. That he is also a fine actor is important, because the film requires him to show many conflicting aspects of Wilde's life ... [He] brings a depth and gentleness to the role."

In the Los Angeles Times, Kevin Thomas stated the film "has found a perfect Oscar in the formidably talented Stephen Fry ... Coupled with Julian Mitchell's superb script ... and director Brian Gilbert's total commitment to it and to his sterling cast, this deeply moving Wilde is likely to remain the definitive screen treatment of Oscar Wilde for years to come ... Gilbert clearly gave Fry and Law the confidence to play roles that would require a baring of souls, and they are triumphant ... Unfortunately, the film is marred by Debbie Wiseman's trite, overly emotional score, which has the effect of needlessly underlining every point along the way that has otherwise been made so subtly. It is especially undermining in its morose tone in the film's final sequences, when the pace naturally slows down as Wilde's life enters its final phase. Everyone else involved in the making of Wilde has done an exemplary job illuminating a man and his era."

Mick LaSalle of the San Francisco Chronicle called it "a sympathetic and, for the most part, nicely realized look into the private life of the flamboyant author" and commented, "Stephen Fry has the title role, and it's hard to imagine a more appropriate actor ... In the last third, the film derails somewhat by turning preachy ... While [it] captures its subject's singular charm, it ultimately doesn't do justice to his complexity."

In the San Francisco Examiner, David Armstrong said the film "benefits from its lush period costumes and settings but gains even more from an accomplished cast of British film and stage actors ... Stephen Fry ... slips right under the skin of the title character [and] presents a multidimensional portrait of a complex man ... However, Wilde, like Wilde, is flawed. Gilbert's direction is sturdy but uninspired, and Ehle's part is underwritten. To her credit, Ehle movingly conveys the sad frustration that Wilde implanted in his lonely wife; but Ehle has to do the work, playing her feelings on her face, with little help from Julian Mitchell's screenplay."

Derek Elley of Variety observed, "Brian Gilbert, till now only a journeyman director, brings to the picture most of the qualities that were memorably absent in his previous costumer, Tom & Viv – visual fluency, deep-seated emotion and first rate playing from his cast."

In the Evening Standard, Alexander Walker called the film "an impressive and touching work of intelligence, compassion and tragic stature" and said Stephen Fry "returns to the top of the class with a dominating screen performance."

In his review in Time Out New York, Andrew Johnston observed that "The first hour – filled with sharp humor and steamy gay sex – delivers a thoroughly modern portrait of Wilde, and Fry (who in costume bears an astonishing resemblance to the writer) plays him with a pitch-perfect combination of smugness and warmth."

Home media
The film was released on DVD in 2002.  A region 2 Blu-ray was released in December 2015.

Accolades
 Golden Globe Award for Best Actor – Motion Picture Drama (Stephen Fry, Nominee)
 BAFTA Award for Best Actress in a Supporting Role (Jennifer Ehle and Zoë Wanamaker, Nominees)
 Evening Standard British Film Award for Most Promising Newcomer (Jude Law, Nominee)
 Evening Standard British Film Award for Best Technical/Artistic Achievement (Maria Djurkovic, Nominee)
 GLAAD Media Award for Outstanding Film (Nominee)
 Satellite Award for Best Actor - Motion Picture Drama (Fry, Nominee)
 Seattle International Film Festival Golden Space Needle Award for Best Actor (Fry, Winner)
 Ivor Novello Award for Best Score (Debbie Wiseman, Winner)

See also
The Happy Prince a 2018 film that focuses on Wilde's life after his release from prison.

References

External links
 
 
 
 

1997 films
1997 LGBT-related films
1990s English-language films
1990s biographical drama films
1990s historical films
British biographical drama films
British historical films
British LGBT-related films
Biographical films about poets
Biographical films about writers
LGBT-related films based on actual events
Films based on biographies
Films set in England
Films set in London
Films set in Oxford
Films set in 1882
Films set in the 1890s
Cultural depictions of Oscar Wilde
Gay-related films
1997 drama films
Films directed by Brian Gilbert
Biographical films about LGBT people
1990s British films